Inlow Hall may refer to:

Indiana University Robert H. McKinney School of Law, Indiana
Inlow Hall (Eastern Oregon University), La Grande, Oregon